This list of European art awards covers some of the main art awards given by organizations in Europe. Some are restricted to artists in a particular genre or from a given country or region, while others are broader in scope. The list is organized by region.

Eastern Europe

South Europe

Scandinavia

Western Europe

United Kingdom

See also

Lists of awards
Lists of art awards

References

 
European